Valdir Azevedo or Waldir Azevedo (January 23, 1923 in Rio de Janeiro – September 21, 1980 in São Paulo) was a choro composer, conductor and performer, considered to be the most successful musician of this genre.

Azevedo was born in Rio de Janeiro, Brazil. He played flute starting from the age of seven, and later switched to mandolin and to the cavaquinho. He first performed in public in 1933 at the Carnival, playing flute.

He wrote 130 compositions during his lifetime, including the world-famous "Brasileirinho" and "Delicado", which was  He is considered by many to be the first Brazilian cavaquinho shredder ever. One of his compositions, "Delicado," is a Latin American dance that has been arranged for piano.

He died in São Paulo, aged 57.

References

External links
[ allmusic profile]

Further reading
 

1923 births
1980 deaths
Choro musicians
Musicians from Rio de Janeiro (city)
20th-century composers